2,3-diketo-5-methylthiopentyl-1-phosphate enolase (DK-MTP-1-P enolase, MtnW, YkrW, RuBisCO-like protein, RLP) is an enzyme with systematic name 2,3-diketo-5-methylthiopentyl-1-phosphate keto-enol-isomerase. This enzyme catalyses the following chemical reaction

 5-(methylthio)-2,3-dioxopentyl phosphate  2-hydroxy-5-(methylthio)-3-oxopent-1-enyl phosphate

The enzyme participates in the methionine salvage pathway in Bacillus subtilis.

References

External links 
 

EC 5.3.2